This is an episode list for the Kids' WB animated series, Shaggy & Scooby-Doo Get a Clue!.


Series overview

Episodes

Season 1 (2006–07)

Season 2 (2007–08)

Lists of American children's animated television series episodes
Lists of Scooby-Doo television series episodes